John Fearn Thornley (8 August 1875 – 1956) was an English footballer who played in the Football League for Gainsborough Trinity and Nottingham Forest.

References

1875 births
1956 deaths
English footballers
Association football midfielders
English Football League players
Hucknall St John's F.C. players
Nottingham Forest F.C. players
Gainsborough Trinity F.C. players